Taiwan Second Division Football League (sometimes called Taiwan Football Challenge League) is the second-ranked division in the Taiwanese football league run by Chinese Taipei Football Association (CTFA).  This League is directly below the Taiwan Premier League. The league currently comprises eight teams from around Taiwan.

Competition format 

The Taiwan Football Second Division League's schedule usually runs from July to November, after the initial qualifiers where new entries play own tournament, with top 2 playing last 2 from previous Challenge League season. It currently contains 8 teams that compete in a double leg round-robin tournament, each composed of seven games. After the 14-game schedule is completed, the top team wins the league title and an automatic berth in the following year's  Taiwan Football Premier League .

Since 2020, a system of  promotion and relegation  exists between the Premier League and the  Taiwan Football Challenge League . The top team from the Second Division league is promoted to Premier League and the lowest placed team in the Premier League is relegated to the Second Division League. The runner-up of the Second Division League will play in a qualification tournament with the 7th-placed team from the Premier League.

2022 teams

Currently there are 8 teams competing in this league.  The league has implemented a promotion and relegation system.

Champions

References

 
2
Sports leagues established in 2020
2020 establishments in Taiwan
Professional sports leagues in Taiwan
Second level football leagues in Asia